Delicious is a series that premiered on Sky 1 on 30 December 2016. Written by Dan Sefton and directed by Clare Kilner and John Hardwick, the four-part first series aired on Sky 1 from December 2016 to January 2017. Sky renewed the show for a second series in February 2017. The second series aired on Sky 1 from Friday, 29 December 2017. On 13 February 2018, it was announced that Delicious had been renewed for a third season.

The series is predominantly filmed in South East Cornwall with Pentillie Castle featuring as Leo's Penrose Hotel. While many of the exterior shots are filmed at Pentillie Castle, the interiors can be found at a number of other country houses including Port Eliot and Boconnoc. Some scenes were filmed in Calstock on the river Tamar, and include scenes in and around Lishe, a local tea room.  On 23 June 2019 Dawn French confirmed the show will not be coming back for a fourth season.

Synopsis
The series is set in Cornwall, England, where celebrity chef Leo is married to the beautiful Sam and has a successful hotel business. However, he is having an affair with his first wife Gina, a talented cook from whom he stole many of his recipes and cheated on for years.

Leo has a grown daughter Teresa with Gina and a grown son Michael with Sam. Leo’s mother Mimi is alive, and lives at the hotel. At the end of the first episode, Leo dies, but he does not disappear. He comes back in memories or in conversations with Gina, or as a voice commenting on the dilemmas faced by those he loved. The restaurant is left to Gina, while the money is left to Sam. There is not much money, so Sam and Gina decide to run the hotel together. Teresa’s real father James shows up, Gina’s ex; Michael and Teresa learn they are not half siblings. One year after Leo dies, another grown son, Adam, a chef, appears on the scene, product of an affair Leo had with a supplier and whom Gina has taken on as her protégé. Further, Gina’s father appears at the hotel.

Gina marries James, Teresa’s father, in a huge wedding and reception at the hotel. En route to their honeymoon, Gina tells him she cannot be married and walks out. Michael and Teresa go off travelling together; Teresa returns home alone at the start of Series 3. Mimi gives Teresa a pregnancy test kit. Teresa is pregnant. Mimi has had a biopsy of a lump but has not looked at the results of the biopsy. Mimi and Teresa make a pact to keep each other’s secrets. Meanwhile, Gina and Sam separately sleep with the same man, Mason Elliot, who loves Gina’s cooking and is sought by Gina as an investor in the hotel. Teresa begins working in the hotel, with a focus on keeping the cost of supplies in line.

Cast and characters

Overview

Main characters 
Dawn French as Gina Benelli, Leo's first wife and mentor, later owner of the Penrose Hotel and chef at its restaurant
Emilia Fox as Sam Vincent, Leo's widow, eventually manager and co-owner of the Penrose
Iain Glen as Leo Vincent, a celebrity chef and owner of the Penrose, prior to his death
Tanya Reynolds as Teresa Benelli, Leo and Gina's daughter, eventually Sam's assistant manager
Ruairí O'Connor as Michael Vincent, Leo and Sam's son (series 1-2)
Sheila Hancock as Mimi Vincent, Leo's mother, eventually the Penrose's concierge following Suzy's resignation
Risteárd Cooper as James Harley, Gina's ex-boyfriend and Teresa's biological father (series 1-2)
Aaron Anthony as Adam Hesketh, Gina's sous-chef and Leo's biological son (series 2-3)
Franco Nero as Giuseppe "Joe" Benelli, Gina's estranged father (series 2)
Rhashan Stone as Marc Wilson, Sam's high school boyfriend (series 2-3)
Vincent Regan as Mason Elliot, a wealthy restaurateur and investor who becomes a rival chef to Gina (series 3)

Supporting characters 
Vinette Robinson as Rosa, the town doctor (series 1)
Kemi-Bo Jacobs as Suzy, the Penrose's concierge (series 1-2)
Mark Letheren as Dio Tremayne, Michael's friend, later an employee at the Penrose (series 1-3)
Pandora Colin as DI Marilyn Hicks, who investigates Leo and later Sam and Gina for fraud (series 1-2)
Aidan McArdle as DI Jonathan Jones, Hicks' detective partner (series 2)
Cassie Clare as Rhiannon, a chef and waitress in Mason's restaurant (series 3)
Claudia Harrison as Dr. Janice Woods, Mimi's doctor (series 3)

Episodes

Series 1 (2016-2017)

Series 2 (2017-2018)

Series 3 (2018-2019)

Production
The series is filmed in Cornwall and features the Pentillie Castle as the "Penrose Hotel" run by Leo. Interiors scenes in Mason's restaurant were filmed in the River Cottage Kitchen (now closed) at the Royal William Yard in Plymouth.

International broadcast
In Australia, Delicious premiered on ABC Television in May 2017.
In Sweden on SVT1 in January 2018 and in the Netherlands on NPO 1 in July 2018 . 
In Finland Yle1 in September 2019

Reception

Critical response
The series has garnered mixed reviews. The Sydney Morning Heralds Bridget McManus gave the first episode four stars out of four and praised French's performance. The Radio Times Ben Dowell commented positively on the series, saying it has "offered a visual feast but it’s the sure-footed storytelling and strong central performances that has got me hooked."

On the other hand, The Daily Telegraphs Ed Power gave the first episode two stars out of five, saying: "The awkward blend of soapy escapism and dark comedy left a funny taste, with mismatched performances adding to the queasiness."

Ratings
The first season of Delicious had an average audience of 1.87 million, making it the most watched Sky 1 original drama in 2016.

Home media

References

External links
 

2016 British television series debuts
2019 British television series endings
2010s British comedy television series
2010s British drama television series
Sky UK original programming
English-language television shows
Television series by Endemol
Television shows set in Cornwall